Penicillium carneum is a fungus species of the genus of Penicillium. Penicillium roqueforti var. carneum was reclassified to Penicillium carneum. P. carneum was isolated from spoiled meat products, silage, rye bread, water, beer, cheese, mouldy barkers yeast and cork. P. carneum produces patulin, penicillic acid, penitrem A, mycophenolic acid roquefortines.

See also
List of Penicillium species

References 

carneum
Fungi described in 1996